The Unknown Singer may refer to:
 The Unknown Singer (1947 film), a French drama film
 The Unknown Singer (1931 film), a French drama film